Rayman 3: Hoodlum Havoc is a 2003 platform game developed and published by Ubisoft, and the third major installment in the Rayman series. It tells the story of how Rayman stops André, an evil black lum, from taking over the world with his army of sack-like "Hoodlum" soldiers. Unlike the game's predecessor Rayman 2: The Great Escape, Rayman 3 took a more light-hearted turn, utilizing sarcastic self-referential undertones while also poking fun at the platforming video game genre. It was released for the GameCube, PlayStation 2, Xbox and Microsoft Windows, and on OS X by Feral Interactive in 2004. 2D versions of the game were developed for the Game Boy Advance, N-Gage and mobile phones since the beta version and the prototype versions were made in 2002.

A remastered HD version was released for PlayStation Network and Xbox Live Arcade in 2012. A follow up game, Rayman: Hoodlums' Revenge, was released for the Game Boy Advance in 2005. This would be the last main series Rayman game to be released until Rayman Origins in 2011.

Gameplay 
Rayman's controls are similar to that of Rayman 2: The Great Escape, albeit utilising long-ranged punches (and kicks at some opportunities), instead of throwing Energy Spheres. Rayman can restore health by picking up Red Lums. Instead of permanent upgrades to his abilities, Rayman can find special "Laser Detergent" cans (used by the Hoodlums to turn their clothes into combat fatigues) containing one of five temporary power-ups. The Vortex allows Rayman to fire mini-tornadoes instead of punching, the Heavy Metal Fist increases Rayman's strength and allows him to break down certain doors, the Lockjaw gives Rayman extendable claw weapons that can be used to latch onto and electrocute enemies or swing across gaps, the Shock Rocket allows Rayman to fire a remote controlled missile, and the Throttle Copter provides Rayman with a special helmet that allows him to fly vertically for a limited time. After a certain point in the game, Rayman gains the ability to pull a face similar to the original game, which allows him to turn Black Lums left behind from defeating Hoodlums into Red Lums.

Unlike most entries, Rayman 3 features a scoring system that tallies points based on Rayman's actions. Whenever points are scored, this system switches to a "Combo mode" that adds even more points acquired from Rayman's actions, though if the player's scoring stops after a few seconds, the Combo mode ends as well. If using a power-up acquired from a Laser Detergent, points earned are doubled. Points earned can unlock hidden content and, in some levels, allow access to hidden areas. Players could enter their final overall game scores onto the RaymanZone website.

Plot 
One night, a Black Lum named André, who was supposedly said to have grown out of pure evil, appears and transforms other Red Lums into Black Lums to join him. The group eventually gains enough hair from various animals throughout the forest to dress themselves as scarecrow-like Hoodlums. In the middle of the process, Murfy, one of the residents and workers of the Fairy Council, discovers them. André later finds him hiding nearby, and he and his Black Lums pursue him. Murfy is chased to a small clearing, where Rayman and his friend Globox are sound asleep. Just after Murfy reaches them, Globox is awakened by the commotion. Now aware of the situation, Globox helps Murfy to try and get Rayman, who is still asleep, to safety. In the process, Globox accidentally removes Rayman's hands, forcing Murfy to pick Rayman up by his hair and fly him away from the clearing himself. In an attempt to save himself, Globox runs away to safety, taking Rayman's hands along with him.

As time passes, more and more Hoodlums invade the forest. After Rayman wakes up, he and Murfy reach the entrance to the Council and discover Globox hiding in a barrel. Just as Rayman gets his hands back from Globox, André and a few of his minions appear, following Globox as he flees into the Council. As Rayman and Murfy pursue them, they learn of André's evil plan: to taint the heart of the world so that he can create an army of Hoodlums. Eventually, André catches up with Globox, who ends up accidentally swallowing the evil creature. Afterwards, Rayman attempts to seek out a doctor that can rid André from Globox's insides and Murfy departs from the team, warning Rayman the Black Lum may force Globox to drink plum juice, in spite of the latter's allergy to it. Rayman meets up with three doctors: Otto Psi (a play on the word autopsy), Romeo Patti (homeopathy), and Art Rytus (arthritis). After all three doctors make independent attempts at purging André by using various parts of Globox's body as musical instruments, they succeed in getting rid of him after collaborating in Art Rytus' clinic room. Refusing to admit defeat, André teams up with Reflux, a member of the Knaaren race that Rayman had previously defeated.

Reflux steals the scepter of the Leptys – a god worshiped by his people – from the child king of the Knaaren and uses it to increase his power, which in turn will allow Andre to infinitely reproduce. With Globox's help, Rayman climbs to the top of the Tower of the Leptys and faces Reflux and André as the former transforms into a giant winged monster. After a prolonged battle, Rayman and Globox destroy Reflux and Rayman turns André back into a Red Lum through scaring him by pulling a face (a power he himself had acquired prior from being imbued with the Leptys' power), which results in all the Black Lums turning back into Red Lums.  Shortly thereafter, Rayman and Globox return to the clearing that they were in before. Before they resume their nap, Globox admits that he misses André and would like him back, but Rayman says that's not a good idea and that he doesn't know how to get him back. Globox says that a Red Lum has to be scared to be a Black Lum, to which Rayman replies that he would hate to imagine what could scare a Lum.  A flashback to before the beginning of the game reveals that Rayman unwittingly created André when his hands went off on their own and scared a Red Lum with frightening shadow puppets.

Versions 

As a counterpart to the 3D PC and console versions of the game, the Game Boy Advance and N-Gage versions of the game were 2D sidescrolling platformers, controlling similarly to the original Rayman game.

The GameCube version of the game features exclusive content compared to the other releases of the game, which include several minigames. Additional content could be unlocked by connecting the Game Boy Advance version of the game to it.

A high definition version of Rayman 3, titled Rayman 3 HD, was announced by Ubisoft in November 2011 and was released on PlayStation Network and Xbox Live Arcade in March 2012, nine years after the original version. The game runs at 60 frames per second, in up to 720p. This version includes the original game content, and features newly introduced leaderboards and Trophies/Achievements.  However, it lacks the original intro which featured the Groove Armada song "Madder", and also lacks the "Wanna Kick Rayman" bonus videos, which are replaced with the pages from the art book that came with the collector's edition of Rayman Origins. This game also has a different ESRB rating than its non-HD counterpart, which is E for Everyone, whereas the HD version is rated E10+.

Reception 

By the end of March 2003, Rayman 3: Hoodlum Havoc had sold more than 1 million copies.

Rayman 3: Hoodlum Havoc received generally positive reviews from critics. Review aggregator websites GameRankings and Metacritic gave the Game Boy Advance version 82% and 83/100, the PlayStation 2 version 80% and 76/100, the PC version 78% and 74/100, the GameCube version 78% and 77/100, the Xbox version 77% and 75/100, the Xbox 360 version 69/100, and the PlayStation 3 version 72/100.

References

External links 

2003 video games
3D platform games
Feral Interactive games
Game Boy Advance games
Metafictional video games
Self-reflexive video games
Steampunk video games
Video games about witchcraft
Multiplayer and single-player video games
N-Gage games
GameCube games
MacOS games
PlayStation 2 games
PlayStation Network games
Rayman
Video games about size change
Video games about dreams
Video games developed in China
Video games developed in France
Video games with alternative versions
Windows games
Xbox games
Xbox 360 Live Arcade games
Gameloft games
Games with GameCube-GBA connectivity
Virtual Console games for Wii U